The Ashland Public Library is a historic building in Ashland, Nebraska. It was built by W.R. Shankland as a Carnegie library in 1911. Besides the $5,500 donation from Andrew Carnegie, its construction had much to do with the Wiggenhorn family: the land was donated by Mr and Mrs Wiggenhorn Jr., and the roof was donated by H. A. Wiggenhorn. The building was designed in the Jacobethan style by Fisher & Lawrie, an architectural firm based in Omaha co-founded by Scottish-born Harry Lawrie and his American counterpart, George Lee Fisher. It has been listed on the National Register of Historic Places since January 27, 1983.

References

National Register of Historic Places in Saunders County, Nebraska
Jacobean architecture in the United States
Library buildings completed in 1911
Carnegie libraries in Nebraska